Marilao, officially the Municipality of Marilao,  is a 1st class municipality in the province of Bulacan, Philippines. According to the 2020 census, it has a population of 254,453 people.

With the continuous expansion of Metro Manila, the municipality is part of Manila's built-up area which reaches San Ildefonso on its northernmost part.

Marilao is one of the 21 Philippine municipalities that have met the requirements for cityhood set by the Constitution and Local Government Code of the Republic of the Philippines and as agreed upon by the League of Cities of the Philippines (LCP).

History
Long before the establishment as an independent town, Marilao traces its origin as little as a barrio. It was initially a barrio of its neighboring town Meycauayan and the Franciscan missionaries from Meycauayan built a visita (chapel) dedicated to Saint Michael the Archangel.

Marilao, just like Pangil, a town in Laguna, Philippines, was under the stewardship of the Franciscan order.

On April 21, 1796, the Barrio of Marilao was established as a pueblo as approved by the Alcalde Mayor of Bulacan and the Franciscan friars of Meycauayan, with the approval of Archbishop of Manila, the visita of San Miguel Arcangel became a town church where Padre Vicente de Talavera served as its parish priest. In 1913, Marilao completely became an independent town.

Geography

Climate

Barangays
Marilao is politically subdivided into 16 barangays, all classified as urban.

Pollution and flooding
In 2007, Marilao, along with neighboring Meycauayan, share a slot in the list of the world's 30 most polluted places in the developing world drawn up by a private New York-based institute. In its report, “The World’s Worst Polluted Places” for 2007, the Blacksmith Institute said: “Industrial waste is haphazardly dumped into the Meycauayan, Marilao and Obando River system, a source of drinking and agricultural water supplies for the 250,000 people living in and around” the Meycauayan-Marilao area.

Marilao is also notorious for frequent flooding during the monsoon season. A section of MacArthur Highway near SM City Marilao is in particular, prone to floods.

Demographics

Economy

Government

Elected officials

List of local chief executives

Education
The Pambayang Dalubhasaan ng Marilao Municipal College of Marilao is a public college in Marilao. The public primary and secondary schools in Marilao are governed by the Department of Education-Provincial Schools Division of Bulacan. Several private schools in Marilao also provide education services.

Public High Schools
 Assemblywoman Felicita G. Bernardino Memorial Trade School(AFGBMTS)
 Prenza National High School(PNHS)

Religion

National Shrine of the Divine Mercy
It was elevated to the status of National Shrine by Archbishop Orlando Quevedo of the Catholic Bishops Conference of the Philippines. The first mass was held at the site on February 2, 1992, the Feast of the Presentation. Located in Barangay Santa Rosa I.

On the occasion of the World Apostolic Congress on Mercy in 2017, a 38-meter Statue of Merciful Jesus was built here.

San Miguel Arcangel Parish Church

The Parish celebrates its patronal feasts on May 8 and September 29. Its 28th Parish Priest, Rev. Fr. Alberto D.J. Santiago succeeded Fr. Avelino G. Santos. Under Parochial Vicar, Fr. Francis Protacio S. Cortez III,OSA. It is hundred years old spiritual edifice in Poblacion I considered as “place marker” and serve as “point of orientation” to the local residents and visitors.

Our Lady of Fatima Parish Church

Located in Barangay Loma de Gato.

Our Lady of Mercy Quasi-parish Church

Located in Barangay Loma de Gato.

There are also a presence of other religions in Marilao like the Iglesia ni Cristo,Jehova's Witnesses, Born Again Christians, Members of Church of God International, etc.

Gallery

References

External links

Bulacan Official Website - Marilao
Marilao Bulacan
New Website of Marilao
 [ Philippine Standard Geographic Code]
Philippine Census Information
The Blacksmith Institute - World's Worst Polluted Places
Iglesia, "Ang Bayan ng Dios" - Multiply Website

Municipalities of Bulacan